The following is a list of the world's largest publicly traded financial services companies, ordered by annual sales for the latest Fiscal Year in millions of U.S. dollars according to the Fortune Global 500. (Currently the top 50 public companies are included, while privately held companies are not included).

2021

2018 
The following is a list of the world's largest publicly traded financial services companies, ordered by annual sales for the latest Fiscal Year that ended March 31, 2018 or prior (all public companies with sales of $20 billion or more are included, while privately held companies are not included).

See also
 List of largest manufacturing companies by revenue
 List of largest oil and gas companies by revenue
 List of largest employers in the United States
 List of largest companies by revenue
 List of public corporations by market capitalization
 List of companies by profit and loss
 Forbes Global 2000
 List of wealthiest organizations

References 
 fortune.com - Global 500
 forbes.com - Global 2000

Lists of companies by revenue

Economy-related lists of superlatives
Financial services